Frank Atwood Baird (April 10, 1912 – March 20, 2007) was an American basketball player.  An early professional in the National Basketball League, he was also an All-American college player at Butler University.  Baird played both baseball and basketball at Butler.  He then played several years for the Indianapolis Kautskys, averaging 5.1 points per game for his career.

Following his playing career, Baird coached basketball at Broad Ripple High School in Indianapolis. He also officiated college football from 1940 through 1974, including some Tangerine Bowl and Grantland Rice Bowl games. He has been named to the Indiana Basketball Hall of Fame, the Indiana Football Hall of Fame, the Indiana Baseball Hall of Fame and the Butler Athletic Hall of Fame.

References

External links
Indiana Basketball Hall of Fame bio
Indiana Football Hall of Fame bio

1912 births
2007 deaths
All-American college men's basketball players
American men's basketball players
Basketball coaches from Indiana
Basketball coaches from Ohio
Basketball players from Indianapolis
Basketball players from Ohio
Butler Bulldogs baseball players
Butler Bulldogs men's basketball players
Forwards (basketball)
Guards (basketball)
High school basketball coaches in Indiana
Indianapolis Kautskys players
Sportspeople from Toledo, Ohio
Arsenal Technical High School alumni